Protein Dr1 is a protein that in humans is encoded by the DR1 gene.

Function 

This gene encodes a TBP- (TATA box-binding protein) associated phosphoprotein that represses both basal and activated levels of transcription. The encoded protein is phosphorylated in vivo and this phosphorylation affects its interaction with TBP. This protein contains a histone fold motif at the amino terminus, a TBP-binding domain, and a glutamine- and alanine-rich region. The binding of DR1 repressor complexes to TBP-promoter complexes may establish a mechanism in which an altered DNA conformation, together with the formation of higher order complexes, inhibits the assembly of the preinitiation complex and controls the rate of RNA polymerase II transcription.

Interactions 

DR1 (gene) has been shown to interact with DRAP1.

References

Further reading